Leucocoprinus mauritianus is a species of mushroom producing fungus in the family Agaricaceae.

Taxonomy 
It was described in 1908 by the German mycologist Paul Christoph Hennings who classified it as Lepiota mauritiana.

In 2004 it was reclassified as Leucocoprinus mauritianus by the mycologist Peter Mohr.

Description 
Leucocoprinus mauritianus is a small dapperling mushroom with thin white flesh. Hennings provided only a basic description of this species:

Cap: 1.6-2.2cm wide, ovoid to campanulate with an obtuse umbo. The surface is grey with a scaly brown umbo and sulcate striations from the margin, where there are fissures and folds. Gills: Freem, crowded and pale with a ventricose bulge. Stem: Smooth and pale running equally to the base, which is not significantly bulbous. Hollow. The stem ring membranous and whitish. Spores: 9-12 x 6-7 μm. Subovoid. Hyaline.

Etymology 
The specific epithet mauritianus, originally mauritiana is named for Mauritius where it was found.

Habitat and distribution 
The specimens studied by Hennings were found growing on the ground in Mauritius.

References 

mauritianus
Fungi described in 1908